

Overview 
The Clathrinida are an order of calcareous sponges found in marine environments. These sponges have an asconoid structure and lack a true dermal membrane or cortex. The spongocoel is lined with choanocytes.

Taxonomy 
Animalia (kingdom) → Porifera (phylum) → Calcarea (class) → Calcinea (subclass) → Clathrinida (order)

History of Classification of Clathrinida 
In 1872, Ernst Haeckel first classified the class of calcareous sponges under porifera phylum based on the composition of spicules and the aquiferous system. His method was criticized by other taxonomists, who believed Haeckel’s taxonomic scheme is unnatural. One of the critics was Poléjaeff, who proposed a more natural taxonomy in 1883, which adopted the auriferous part of Haeckel’s proposal. Several taxonomists struggled for another 70 years, and divided calcareous sponges into two subclasses based on cytological and skeletal traits: Calcinea and Calcaronea. In 1958, Hartman proposed the order Clathrinida and Leucettida under subclass Calcinea, taking body cortex as the key character. And then in 2002, Borojevic and other taxonomists stated that the order Leucettida was extinct as corticalization and the aquiferous systems evolved in several lineages.

Calcarea 
All sponges in this class are strictly marine, and, while they are distributed worldwide, most are found in shallow tropical waters. Like nearly all other sponges, they are sedentary filter feeders. Of the 15,000 or so species of Porifera that exist, only 400 of those are calcareans. Calcarean sponges first appeared during the Cambrian, and their diversity was greatest during the Cretaceous period.

Calcinea 
The subclass Calcinea is monophyletic, meaning descended from a common evolutionary ancestor without sharing with any other group. There are two orders under Calcinea: Clathrinida and Murrayonida. There is debate about whether Murrayonida is at the same phylogenetical level as Clathrinida, or is within Clathrinida, since some researchers are not convinced that hyper-calcified skeleton is a valid taxonomic character.

Clathrinida 
Clathrinida is a well-known non-monophyletic order. In 2013, Klautau and his team proposed that skeleton and body anastomosis are the most valid characters when assigning the taxonomy for Clathrinida. The team used DNA sequencing to confirm the biological source of 50 species within 8 genera of Clathrinida, and re-classified Clathrinida into 10 genera.

10 Genera that Klautau proposed

(1) Clathrina 

 All species in Clathrina genus are lack of tetractines in their skeleton.
 Including Clathrina clathrus, Clathrina helveola, Clathrina cylindractina, Guancha ramose, Guancha aff. blanca, ect.

(2) Ernstia 

 Species in Ernstia have triactines and tetractines, and regular clathroid body quite similar to that of Clathrina.
 Including Clathrina sp.nov.1 from Brazil, Clathrina sp.nov.2 from Brazil, Clathrina sp.nov.13 from Indonesia, and Clathrina tetractina from Brazil.

(3) Ascandra 

 Sister group of genus Ernstia, but species in genus Ascandra have loose free tubes in apical region of their cormus.

(4) Ascaltis 

 One species of Clathrina reticulum, characterized by tightly free tubes, and a pseudo-atrium with no pinacoderm.

(5) Leucascus 

 One species of Leucascus simplex with has tightly free tubes, a true atrium with pinacoerm, apical actines with spines, and a solenoid aquiferous system.

(6) Arthuria 

 One species of Clathrina hirsute. C. hirsute has triactines, and tetractines.

(7) Borojevia 

 Characterized by well-defined cormus with tripods on the external tubes, triactines, and tetractines with spines on the apical actines.
 Including Clathrina brasiliensis, Clathrina cerebrum, Clathrina aspina, ect.

(8) Leucaltis 

 Leucaltis clathria from Australia and Caribbean. Characterized by large tubes each with distinct cortex with large spicules.

(9) Brattegardia 

 One species of Clathrina nanseni with a single osculum and a cormus surrounded by a membrane. Characterized by skeleton with triactines and 2 tetractines (normal apical actine and rudimentary knob-like apical actine).

(10) Original Leucaltis nuda 

 Including Leucetta floridana, Leucetta microraphis, Pericharax heteroaphis, Leucettusa nuda, Leucetta pyriformis, ect.

Basic Structure 
The Clathrinida is a rich and variable tubular organism. The sponge is organized into simple tubes called the olynthus with an internal and external layer. Both layers are present in the early development stages of Clathrinida and the complex adult body still originates from the original olynthus. The adults grow from the olynthus and through division the tube is separated into separate functional units called cormus. These separate units have degrees of differentiation based on their function, but have a central tube taking the function of the atrium. Skeleton and body anastomosis are the most valid characters when assigning the taxonomy for Clathrinida.

Distribution 
Clathrinida is found across all seas in generally shallow waters. Higher abundances of these sponges is found in shaded habitats such as marine caves. During higher temperatures and subtropical conditions, they are more abundant because they are sexually reproductive. This is due to the fact that water passes easily through the sponges and therefore they respond to changes in the water temperature.

References

 
Sponge orders